Let's Get Laid is a 1978 British comedy film directed by James Kenelm Clarke and starring Robin Askwith, Fiona Richmond and Anthony Steel. The screenplay concerns a man, Gordon Laid, who returns to London after being demobbed at the end of the Second World War - only to find himself suspected of a murder in Wapping.

It was the second of two movies Steel made with Fiona Richmond.

Cast

References

External links

1978 films
1970s sex comedy films
1970s English-language films
British sex comedy films
Films set in the 1940s
1978 comedy films
Films set in London
Films directed by James Kenelm Clarke
1970s British films